Switzerland, officially the Swiss Confederation, is a collection of semi-autonomous cantons. As membership of the confederation has fluctuated throughout history, each of these cantons has its own unique history and nobility. Typically, each canton had its own constitution, currency, jurisdiction, habits, customs, history, and nobility.

In the Middle Ages, various cantons had families with only local and, in the broad scheme of things, insignificant lands, whereas other cantons had ennobled families abroad. In Switzerland, there was a great number of families of dynasties who were members of the Holy Roman Empire. Other cantons had rulers from the House of Savoy, or from the ruling dynasty of the Kingdom of Burgundy. This diversity prevented the birth of a state with monarchical central authority.

As a general rule, Swiss nobility since the 14th century can be divided into three categories:

nobility acquired by inheritance, under the terms of the family right;
nobility resulting from the ennoblement of a commoner, or from the creation of a new title for someone who is already a noble;
nobility acquired by integration, as was the case in Reyff (1577) or Pontherose (1443). This integration frequently results from a social event, or from one or more alliances with families which already belong to the nobility. Sometimes this was accompanied by the acquisition of a noble domain, for example when the seigniory of Mézières was bought by Jost Freitag in 1547. As a result of this, Jost consequently became a noble.

In Switzerland, where the social classes were historically closer than they were in other countries, there was neither a misalliance nor a loss of nobility due to a noble engaging in manual work or taking up a trade. This is why, for example, the noble Jean Gambach was able to be a manufacturer of scythes in 1442, and the noble Louis de Daguet was able to be a carter at the end of the 18th century. The only cases where individuals lost their nobility were due to illegitimacy or voluntary renunciation.

Bern, Fribourg, Solothurn, Lucerne

From the 15th c. onwards, rising economic and political pressure from the city states enticed more and more families of the traditional feudal nobility to seek membership in the higher echelons of the citizenry. These late-mediaeval urban upper classes were already composed of wealthy commoners (merchants, landowners, and craftspeople) but also of aristocrats from nearby fiefdoms or the descendants of ministeriales (i.e. knightly, originally unfree nobles in the service of eccleastical or secular fiefs). While a  distinction between noble and common patrician families was still upheld for some time, with quotas for certain government positions reserved for each group, these distinctions became  less and less rigid in the early modern era. Non-noble families could still be ennobled by letters patent, be it through the favour of foreign monarchs (most notably the kings of France) or by the cities themselves.

Bern
In Bern a constitutional law created in 1643 the privileged class of the eligible families to the Great Council. Since 1731 the Sovereign prohibits to use titles of nobility conferred by foreign sovereigns; Since 1761 the patricians were authorised to be called ; then on 9 April 1783 the patricians were authorised to use the nobiliary particle "von" (or "de").

Fribourg
The city-state of Fribourg defined its patrician ruling class through the so-called Lettre des Deux-Cents in 1627, and closed their ranks to non-privileged families in 1684. Towards the end of the Ancien Régime, this aristocracy comprised four categories:
titled noble families (Affry, Alt, Diesbach, Maillardoz, Castella de Berlens)
untitled noble families (Boccard, Fégely de Vivy, Fivaz, Gléresse, Griset de Forel, Lenzbourg, Maillard, Praroman, of Prel, Reyff de Cugy, Reynold)
patrician families of noble origin whose nobility is not taken into consideration by the state (Fégely de Prez, for example)
patrician families of common origin (Buman, Castella, Reynold, Weck, Wild, etc.)
As defined in the constitution of 1404, members of the first two categories were barred from certain higher offices (banneret and secret, i.e. secret council) unless they renounced their noble privileges.

In 1782 the Sovereign of Fribourg decided to standardise the situation of these families. He removed all the titles except "noble", authorised all the patricians to use the nobiliary particle "de" (or "von"), and specified that henceforth the loads of "bannerets", "secrets" and "grand-sautier" would be opened to all the patricians. By confirming that all the patricians families were noble either by origin or by being member of the privileged class, this "Règlement relativement à l'introduction de l'égalité des familles patriciennes et de leurs titulatures" (17 and 18 July 1782) is not really a collective ennoblement but the official confirmation of a state of things.

Lucerne
In Lucerne at the end of the 17th century the patricians were named with the title "Junker" and regularly made use of their nobility when they were abroad, particularly when they served in the foreigner armies. Some families also received foreigner letters of nobility.

Solothurn
In Soleure the patriciate in fact was formed gradually. Some families set up the corporations to be able to control the co-optation. So the capacity passed to a definite number of privileged families who then formed a noble patrician whose members were qualified . Numbers of these families accepted letters of nobility abroad, particularly in France.
Noble families of Bern:
von Erlach
von Graffenried
von Gunten
Noble families of Fribourg
Noble families of Soleure
Noble families of Lucerne

Uri, Schwyz, Unterwald
In the cantons of Uri, Schwyz and Unterwald, the political evolution from the Middle Ages to the 19th century was realised by a relatively similar way but really doesn't lead to the constitution of a "patriciate" but rather to the formation of a relatively closed class of new families sharing the political power with the ancient noble families. Some of the new families were ennobled abroad while others were incorporated to the Nobility by "integration".

Noble families of Uri: 
von Attinghausen-Schweinsberg (freiherren, higher nobility; leading family of Uri in the 13/14th c.).
A number of local families were appointed meier (bailiffs) by the abbess of Fraumünster, the ruler of Uri, around the middle of the 13th century. These abbatial  grew more influential after the end of Attinghausen hegemony and are generally considered members of the lower nobility. They include the following families:
Niemirschin (bailiffs of Bürglen)
Schüpfer (related to the Niemirschin; bailiffs of Bürglen, at times landammanns of Uri)
Meier von Erstfeld (bailiffs of Erstfeld, at times eigenleute of Wettingen Abbey)
Meier von Silenen (perhaps related to the Schüpfer; bailiffs of Silenen ca. 1256–1370; originally from Urseren; later also  of the bishop of Sion, with Jost of Silenen ascending to the bishopric itself; influential patrician family in the city of Lucerne)
von Moos (bailiffs of Silenen after 1370; originally most likely  of Disentis in the Urseren valley; would later become an influential family of patricians and industrialists in the city of Lucerne; still extant)
Noble families of Schwyz:
Reding von Bibberegg
Noble families of Unterwald:
Rudenz (originally from the Haslital)

Zürich

In 1400 the city of Zürich formally became autonomous within the Holy Roman Empire. Before this date the only noble families were families of ministériaux. Quickly the political power came to the corporations while giving a dominant position to the noble corporation of the "Constaffel" in which was constituted a "noble chamber" called "adelige Stube zum Rüden Stübli". The members families of the Corporations were mainly in them by heredity.

The members of Stübli used the title "Junker". In 1798 the Stübli did not count any more than eleven families. The Bonstetten family came to Bern in 1463 and ended in 1606. Some still extant families of the nobility of Zürich received additionally foreign titles such as the Hirzel, count in France in 1788.
Noble families of Zurich:
von Kyburg
Bonstetten
Brun
Bürkli
Daeschner
Escher vom Glas
Escher vom Luchs
Hirzel
von Jori
Kilchsperger
Landenberg
Manesse
Meiss
Meyer von Knonau
Mülner
von Orelli
Winterthur

Schaffner, Zug

In the cantons of Schaffners and Zug, the political power belonged to the corporations. So there was not real hereditary prerogative for the governmental loads.

In the canton of Zug the few families who had received letters of nobility abroad are extinguished. The very democratic system of this canton hindered a nobility expansion.

In the canton of Schaffner the noble families formed since the 13th century the "Herrenstube" which became during the 15th century one of the twelve corporations. Some ancient families were extinguished and replaced in the "Herrenstube" by new families of the "integration nobility". In 1864 these families were maintained in their right to be buried in the "Junkernfriedhof", their last privilege.
Noble families of Schaffhouse
Noble families of Zug

Valais, Thurgovie, Tessin
In the cantons of Valais, Thurgovie and Tessin, the former noble families were maintained and only some families were ennobled abroad.

The "patriciat valaisan" which provides in particular the prince-bishops, was formed with families of old nobility but also with some families incorporated into the nobility either by possession of a right of jurisdiction either by membership to the "nobility of integration". Some of these families also accepted letters of nobility abroad. This patriciate was not a patriciate of right but in fact.

Tessin, before becoming a Swiss canton in 1803, did not form a political and administrative unit and there is thus no "nobility of Tessin" in a strict sense, however there are some noble families originating from this area. In Locarno, at the Reformation, two of the three great feudal families of capitanei: Muralto and Orelli emigrated to Zürich. A branch of Muralt was established in Bern. The third great family, Magoria, remained in Locarno. The majority of the families of Tessin ennobled abroad were it by the dukes of Milan.
Noble families of Valais
Noble families of Thurgau
Noble families of Ticino

Grisons
In Grisons there were a great number of families of dynasts and "ministériaux". From the 11th or 12th century, the dynasts owned seigniories on which they held power more in fact than by resulting of a constitutional law. These families maintained their privileges until the 15th century and some families preserved an important situation, in particular Salis and Planta, while some others were ennobles abroad.

In 1794 the Leagues enacted the radical cancelling of the nobility, titles and particles. This prohibition was confirmed in 1803 and 1848.
Noble families of Grisons:
Counts de Salis-Soglio (Vienna, 1748)
Comtes de Salis-Seewis (Versailles, 1777)

Glarus, Appenzell
The canton of Glarus never had of nobility of right. However, in Glarus there are some families ennobled abroad.

In the cantons the families descended from the "State's chief" and from the bailiffs formed in fact a class of "integration nobility".

As for the canton of Appenzell Innerrhoden, there are known direct male decedents of the most elite noble Swiss family currently living abroad.

Noble families of Glarus:
von Glarus
Noble Families of Appenzell
von Sutter

Aargau

The modern canton of Aargau was only created in 1789 under Napoleon, when the previously Austrian Fricktal was joined to the other districts that had been conquered by the Old Swiss Confederacy in 1415. The conquered territories were split into a Bernese area of influence in the west, a small district under the rule of Zürich in the very east, and two larger districts, the Freie Ämter ("free administration districts") and the County of Baden making up the eastern half of the canton. The governance of the latter two districts alternated between the individual member states of the Swiss Confederacy in the form of condominiums. With the house of Habsburg ousted, the Swiss states installed landvögte in several of the newly acquired castles, civil stateholders who wielded the legal and economic powers of the former feudal fief which they now administrated, for example in Lenzburg castle or in the Landvogteischloss (Governor's Castle) in Baden. In contrast, many of the smaller fiefs held by lower nobility (e.g. Hallwyl castle, owned by the family of its founders; or Habsburg castle itself, held at the time of the conquest by the ministerialis Wernher von Wohlen) continued into the new order and were not directly affected by it; several nobles, such as the lords of Reinach on Wildenstein castle, were officially enfeoffed by the conquering cantons, so that the only alteration in their title to the land was a change of liege lord, in this case from the counts of Habsburg to the city-state of Bern.

A number of comital families and other high-ranking nobles are attested in the time before the Swiss conquest:

Vaud
The canton of Vaud, old county then country of Vaud, depended successively of Burgundy, Zähringen, Savoy until 1536, then of Bern. In this canton there were some feudal noble families, families of Savoyard nobility, families of the patrician nobility of Bern, and families of "integration nobility".
Noble families of Vaud:
de Felice

Neuchâtel
Originally seigneurs, the rulers Neuchâtel became counts in the late 13th century and assumed the rank of prince in 1618. Between 1707 and the formation of the modern state of Switzerland in 1848, the title of prince of Neuchâtel was held in personal union by the Kings of Prussia. Due to the continued absence of the rulers, the territory was administered by governors from 1529 onwards. Since the princes frequently ennobled their burghers as a reward for civil service, the Swiss Heraldic archives list more than a hundred aristocratic families with ties to the principality, most of them ennobled after 1500. Older families include D'Arens, Dapifer, Du Donjon, or D'Estavayer.

Geneva
Since the Reformation the Republic of Geneva did not officially recognise the nobility as an organised corps. There were families of old nobility, families of "integration nobility", families who were ennobled abroad, and a great number of noble families refuge at the time of the Reformation.

However, contrary to the generally accepted ideas, the Republic of Geneva made use of its capacity to ennoble. It is in particular what it did on 20 August 1680 by ennobling with a title of count the Noblet family.
Noble families of Geneva:
von Genf

Basel
In 1382 the constitution reserved four seats of the Council for the noble families. From the next century the corporations and thus the town's citizens took the power. The noble families of this time preferred to leave Basel which consequently will have a corporative system. The nobility was then prohibited in Basel. An exception was made for the "barons Wieland" in 1816 under the condition that they will not use their title in Basel. However, there are some noble families whose nobility and titles are earlier to their reception as citizen of Basel.

The canton of Basel had in place of a nobility a patriciate called the Daig, that dominated its political life. Its most prominent members were the families Bernoulli, Burckhardt, Faesch, Iselin, Liechtenhan, Merian, Sarasin, Vischer, and Von der Mühll.

St. Gall
Some of these families consolidated their position by receiving nobility's letters abroad. In 1778 the Sovereign Council fixed the list of the seven families of the "Notenstein" which constituted in fact the nobility of St. Gall. Some families which were not members of the "Notenstein" received nobility's diplomas abroad.
Noble families of St. Gall:
von Rapperswil
von Toggenburg

Current situation
The privileges of the nobility were gradually suspended after 1798, save for a revival in Lucerne and Freiburg during the Restoration from 1814 to 1831. Article 4 on equality of the 1848 Swiss federal constitution, finally made a legal end to the Swiss nobility. Nowadays the titles of nobility appear neither in registry offices nor in public instruments. Sometimes they are tolerated in administrative documents and in the noble's professional life, that is to say in social relations.

About 450 soi-disant noble families are left in Switzerland, either Swiss or foreign. By counting 15 people per family about 1.06% of the population belongs to the nobility, which is comparable to the situation in France. There are large regional differences however: the canton of Appenzell for example has hardly any noble family left, while the canton of Vaud has over a hundred.

See also
 Swiss bourgeoisie
 Bourgeoisie of Geneva

References

External links
Swiss Heraldry Society 
Swiss Noble Society
Noble World Chronologies
Zurich Roll of Arms
Swiss Roll of Arms
Swiss Nobility